William Charles Harrelson (born November 17, 1945) is an American former professional baseball pitcher who appeared in ten games in Major League Baseball for the  California Angels.

Career
Harrelson, a "full blooded Cherokee Indian," was born in Tahlequah, Oklahoma. In 1964, he was signed by the Angels and began his professional baseball career that season. He played in the Pioneer League, California League, and Midwest League in 1964 and 1965 but had little success. In 1966, Harrelson went 8–11 with a 3.31 earned run average in the New York–Penn League; in 1967, he had his best season, going 7–4 with a 2.48 ERA for the California League's San Jose Bees. That performance got him promoted to Class AA, Class AAA, and finally the majors in 1968.

Harrelson made his major league debut with the Angels on July 31, 1968. He was involved in a pitching duel with future Hall of Famer Catfish Hunter that day, both allowing just one run through seven innings. Harrelson gave up just four hits, all singles, through seven, but he weakened in the eighth and eventually took the loss. Almost a month later, on August 27, he earned his only MLB victory by going 5 shutout innings against New York at Yankee Stadium. He allowed only one hit (to Joe Pepitone) but walked six, leaving with a 1–0 lead in the sixth. Andy Messersmith completed the two-man, one-hit shutout and earned the save, as the Angels won 2–0.

Harrelson made his final major league appearance on September 18. His ten big-league games included five starts; he posted a 1–6 record and one complete game, with no saves, and allowed 28 hits and 26 bases on balls in 33 career innings pitched. He struck out 22.

In 1969, Harrelson returned to the minors and played in the Texas League and Pacific Coast League. On January 14, 1970, he was traded to the Cincinnati Reds organization, along with Dan Loomer, for Jack Fisher. Harrelson had losing records in the minors in both 1970 and 1971 before retiring from baseball.

References

External links
, or Retrosheet

1945 births
Living people
Arizona Instructional League Angels players
Bakersfield College alumni
Bakersfield Renegades baseball players
Baseball players from Oklahoma
Batavia Trojans players
California Angels players
Charros de Jalisco players
Cherokee Nation sportspeople
El Paso Sun Kings players
Hawaii Islanders players
Idaho Falls Angels players
Indianapolis Indians players
Major League Baseball pitchers
People from Tahlequah, Oklahoma
Quad Cities Angels players
San Jose Bees players
Seattle Angels players
Tigres de Aragua players
American expatriate baseball players in Venezuela
Trois-Rivières Aigles players
20th-century Native Americans
21st-century Native Americans